Live is the first live album by American country music singer Tanya Tucker. It was released on March 1, 1982, by MCA Records. The album was recorded in the fall of 1981 at John Ascuaga's Nugget Hotel Casino Resort in Reno, Nevada, and produced by Snuff Garrett.

Content
Tucker primarily performs songs that she had recorded and released on her previous studio albums. Three of the songs, however, had not appeared on any of her prior albums: "Somebody Buy This Cowgirl a Beer", "Pecos Promenade", and Robbie Robertson's "The Night They Drove Old Dixie Down", which was made famous earlier by Joan Baez. However, a studio version of "Pecos Promenade" had been featured on the Smokey and the Bandit II soundtrack album.

Critical reception
The review published in the March 13, 1982 issue of Billboard said, "This package is composed primarily of Tucker's top ten hits. The live production effectively captures her raw, gutsy vocals. There's also a cover of "The Night They Drove Old Dixie Down"."

Cashbox also gave a review of the album, which said, "Raw energy and a rough and gravelly voice are Tucker’s trademarks, and nowhere better can these characteristics shine through than in a live concert. Here she is captured in concert at the Nugget, performing songs like her first hit, "Delta Dawn", up through the most recent, "Can I See You Tonight", and the current single, "Somebody Buy This Cowgirl a Beer". The package features 11 songs, including the cowboy anthem, "Texas (When I Die)"."

Track listing

Personnel
Adapted from the album liner notes.
Mark Eshelman – recording
Snuff Garrett - producer
Dave Pell – photography
Gary Singleman - recording
Scott Stogel – recording
Greg Venable – engineer

Charts

References

Tanya Tucker albums
Albums produced by Snuff Garrett
1982 live albums
MCA Records live albums